

1990 Era

1998/99
Roster

1999/00
Roster

2000 Era

2000/01
Roster

2001/02
Roster

2002/03
Roster

2003/04
Roster

2004/05
Roster

2005/06
Roster

2006/07
Roster

2007/08
Roster

2008/09
Roster

2009/10
Roster

2010 Era

2010/11
Roster

2011/12
Roster

2012/13
Roster

2013/14
Roster

2014/15
Roster

2015/16
Roster

2016/17
Roster

2017/18
Roster

2018/19
Roster

2019/20
Roster

2020 Era

2020/21
Roster

2021/22
Roster

See also
See also Fenerbahçe (men's basketball) past rosters

References

Rosters
Fenerbahçe Basketball

tr:Fenerbahçe (basketbol) eski kadroları